Beechdale is suburban area in the City of Nottingham. At the 2001 Census, the area had a population of 5,537.

Facilities
Most facilities in Beechdale are located on Hollington Road and Beechdale Road. Facilities include a LloydsPharmacy, a Premier Convenience Store, a surgeon as well as a barbershop, a pub known as 'The Beechdale', a Texaco petrol station and a motorcycle school.

There are many schools in the Beechdale area, including the Bluecoat Beechdale Academy located off Harvey Road and Glenbrook Crescent, the Trinity Catholic School located off Beechdale Road and The Oakfield School and Sports College located next to Wigman Road as well as other primary and secondary schools in the area.

Previous facilities included the Beechdale Swimming Centre and the Hoods Hideout Soft Play which was known as Beechdale Baths. The centre opened in the 1970s, and was the swimming centre where Rebecca Adlington spent her training. The centre closed down in August 2015 as the council opened the Harvey Hadden Sports Village in Bilborough, and the centre was eventually demolished in early 2017.

Other facilities in the area included a post office, a community centre and a day centre located off Ambergate Road, as well as a small bowling alley located off Beechdale Road.

Demographics
According to the data of the 2001 Census, the area has a population of 5,537, and a majority of the population are aged 25–44 who make up 22.8% of the population.

The census also shows that 82.9% of the population is White British, as well as 1.4% being White Irish and 2.3% being classed as Other White. 1.6% of the population is Mixed Race, 8.6% is Asian or Asian British and 2.1% is Black or Black British. 0.4% of the population is Chinese and other ethnic groups make up 0.1% of the estate's population.

Religion
The 2001 Census shows that 67.3% of the population are Christian and Atheists make up 13.8% of the population. 5.5% of the population are Muslim, 3.1% are Sikh and 0.8% are Hindu. 0.2% of the population are Buddhist, 0.1% are Jewish, other religions make up 0.1% of the population and 9.2% did not state their religion.

Bus services
There are frequent bus services operated by Nottingham City Transport as well as a couple Locallink Services operated by Nottingham Community Transport.

References

Areas of Nottingham